Douglas "Doug" Larsen is an American politician and businessman serving as a member of the North Dakota Senate from the 34th district. Elected in November 2020, he assumed office on December 1, 2020.

Education 
Larsen earned a Bachelor of Science degree in communication arts and political science from Minot State University.

Career 
Larsen has served in the North Dakota Army National Guard for 28 years, currently as a lieutenant colonel. He was the commander of the 112th Aviation Battalion. Outside of politics, Larsen owns Apex Builders, a home building and development company, and a Wingate by Wyndham hotel franchise in Bismarck, North Dakota. He is also a licensed real estate agent. Larsen was elected to the North Dakota Senate in November 2020 and assumed office on December 1, 2020.

References 

Living people
Minot State University alumni
Republican Party North Dakota state senators
Year of birth missing (living people)